The 2001 London Broncos season was the twenty-second in the club's history and their sixth season in the Super League. The club was coached by Tony Rea, competing in Super League VI and finishing in 6th place. The club also got to the fifth round of the Challenge Cup.

2001 London Broncos squad

Sources: ROUND 1-20 - 2001 TETLEYS SUPER LEAGUE2001 BRONCOS SQUAD

Super League VI table

Sources: SLstats - 2001 Summary
Notes

Challenge Cup
For the second consecutive year, the Broncos were knocked out of the cup at the fifth round stage.

References

External links
London Broncos - Rugby League Project

London Broncos seasons
London Broncos